Petter Fauchald (30 March 1930 – 4 January 2013) was a Norwegian footballer. He played for Kapp IF and was capped twice for Norway. With Kapp he played in the 1958–59 Norwegian Main League.

References

External links
 
 

1930 births
2013 deaths
People from Østre Toten
Norwegian footballers
Norway international footballers
Association football forwards
Sportspeople from Innlandet